Iván Malón Aragonés (born 26 August 1986 in Gandia, Valencian Community) is a Spanish footballer who plays for CF Gandía as a right back.

References

External links

1986 births
Living people
People from Gandia
Sportspeople from the Province of Valencia
Spanish footballers
Footballers from the Valencian Community
Association football defenders
Segunda División players
Segunda División B players
Tercera División players
Divisiones Regionales de Fútbol players
CF Gandía players
Ontinyent CF players
Real Murcia Imperial players
Real Murcia players
Pontevedra CF footballers
Deportivo Alavés players
CD Numancia players
CD Mirandés footballers
Cádiz CF players
Recreativo de Huelva players
CF Badalona players
Super League Greece players
Veria F.C. players
Cypriot First Division players
Ermis Aradippou FC players
Spanish expatriate footballers
Expatriate footballers in Greece
Expatriate footballers in Cyprus
Spanish expatriate sportspeople in Greece
Spanish expatriate sportspeople in Cyprus